Ludwig Siegfried Meinardus (Hooksiel 17  September 1827  - 10 July 1896 Bielefeld) was a German composer. His students included Anna Schuppe.

Selected works

Oratorios
Simon Petrus op. 23 (1857)
Gideon (1862)
König Salomo op. 25 (1862/63)
Luther in Worms (1874)

References

1827 births
1896 deaths